Ross Pearson (born 26 September 1984) is a retired English mixed martial artist who last competed in 2019. A 26-fight veteran of the UFC, he was a three-time "Fight of the Night" winner and was the lightweight winner of The Ultimate Fighter 9.

Background
Pearson, born and raised in Sunderland, England, began training in Tae Kwon Do at the age of six, before adding judo and boxing to his repertoire in high-school. Pearson later began training in mixed martial arts at the age of 17. He also attended Carilion Craft Training in Sunderland. Pearson worked as a brick layer afterwards. Inspired by early UFC events, Pearson decided to become a professional MMA fighter.

MMA career

The Ultimate Fighter reality show
In 2009, Pearson competed on the reality TV show The Ultimate Fighter: United States vs. United Kingdom. He placed first in the lightweight division.

Ultimate Fighting Championship

2010
Pearson defeated kickboxer Dennis Siver by unanimous decision on 31 March at UFC Fight Night 21.

Pearson was submitted by Cole Miller via second-round rear-naked choke on 15 September 2010 at UFC Fight Night 22.

Pearson faced Spencer Fisher on 27 February 2011 at UFC 127. He won the fight via unanimous decision.

2011
Pearson lost to Edson Barboza via split decision at UFC 134 in a bout that earned Fight of the Night honours.

For his next fight, Pearson dropped to Featherweight and faced Junior Assunção on 30 December at UFC 141. Pearson won the fight by unanimous decision.

Pearson faced Cub Swanson on 22 June 2012 at UFC on FX 4. He lost the fight by TKO late into the second round.

2012
In July Pearson was confirmed as the Team UK coach for The Ultimate Fighter: The Smashes.  Pearson faced George Sotiropoulos in a Lightweight bout on 15 December 2012 at UFC on FX 6. He won the fight by an early third-round TKO.

2013
Pearson next faced Ryan Couture on 6 April 2013 at UFC on Fuel TV 9. He won the fight by TKO in the third round.

Pearson faced Melvin Guillard on 26 October 2013 at UFC Fight Night 30. The fight ended in a no contest when Pearson was deemed unable to continue after being cut on the forehead by an accidental illegal knee.

2014
A rematch with Guillard was expected to take place on 8 March 2014 at UFC Fight Night 37. However, Pearson pulled out of the bout citing a knee injury and was replaced by Michael Johnson.

Pearson faced Diego Sanchez on 7 June 2014 at UFC Fight Night 42. Despite outstriking Sanchez in every round, and getting a knockdown in round 2, Pearson would ultimate lose the fight by highly controversial split decision. 13 of 14 media scorecards had the bout 30-27 Pearson, while the 14th had Pearson winning 29–28. As a result, Pearson filed an appeal with the New Mexico Athletic Commission, "in hopes the decision is overturned, at the very least to a no-contest." The official decision was ultimately upheld.  Despite an official loss on the scorecards, UFC president Dana White indicated that the organisation had ruled out the possibility of an immediate rematch and said that they would informally treat it as a win for Pearson, and that he would be compensated that way. UFC paid Pearson $30,000 as an unofficial win bonus

Pearson was expected to face Abel Trujillo on 16 August 2014 at UFC Fight Night 47. However, on 4 August, Trujillo pulled out of the bout and was replaced by Gray Maynard. He won the fight by TKO in the second round. After a close first round, early in the second round Pearson landed a combination which knocked Maynard down, causing the referee, Keith Peterson, to step in to stop the fight as Maynard was deemed not to be intelligently defending himself.

Pearson faced Al Iaquinta on 8 November 2014 at UFC Fight Night 55. Despite being the odds-on-favorite, Pearson lost the fight via TKO in the second round.

2015
Pearson faced Sam Stout on 14 March 2015 at UFC 185. Pearson won the fight via knockout in the second round dropping Stout with a left hook and finishing him with a right hand on the ground.  Subsequently, Pearson won a Performance of the Night bonus.

Pearson faced Evan Dunham on 18 July 2015 at UFC Fight Night 72. He lost the fight via unanimous decision.

Pearson faced Paul Felder on 5 September 2015 at UFC 191. He won the back-and-forth fight by split decision.

2016
Pearson faced Francisco Trinaldo on 17 January at UFC Fight Night 81. He lost the fight via unanimous decision.

Pearson was expected to face Abel Trujillo on 20 March at UFC Fight Night 85. However, Trujillo was removed from the card on 12 March due to alleged visa issues which restricted his entry to Australia. As a result, Pearson faced Chad Laprise on the card. He won the fight via split decision.

Pearson was expected to face James Krause on 8 July at The Ultimate Fighter 23 Finale. However, Krause was pulled from the fight on 13 June for undisclosed reasons and replaced by Will Brooks. Pearson lost the fight via unanimous decision.

After the loss, Ross Pearson moved to the Welterweight division. Pearson explained that cutting less weight gives him more energy and better sleep. He repeatedly had renal and digestive issues due to the weight cut.

Pearson came in as a short notice replacement to face Jorge Masvidal in a welterweight bout on 30 July at UFC 201, filling in for an ill Siyar Bahadurzada. He lost the fight via unanimous decision.

A rescheduled bout with James Krause was scheduled for 19 November at UFC Fight Night 99. Subsequently, on 26 October, Krause pulled out of the fight citing a torn hamstring. He was replaced by Stevie Ray. Pearson lost the fight via split decision.

Despite the three-fight losing streak, Pearson did not want to retire. He wanted the UFC to host an event at Newcastle before retirement.

2017

Pearson faced Dan Hooker on 11 June 2017 at UFC Fight Night 110. He lost the fight via knockout in the second round.

2018
Pearson faced Mizuto Hirota on 11 February 2018 at UFC 221. He won the fight via unanimous decision.

Pearson faced John Makdessi on 28 July 2018 at UFC on Fox 30. He lost the fight by unanimous decision. This fight earned him the Fight of the Night award.

Pearson was expected to face Joseph Duffy on 2 December 2018 at UFC Fight Night 142. However, Pearson announced on 7 November that he was out of the bout due to a broken nose and subsequent surgery to correct the injury.

2019
Pearson faced Desmond Green on 30 March 2019 at UFC on ESPN 2. He lost the fight via technical knockout in round one.

Pearson announced his retirement on 8 April 2019.

Pearson returned to MMA on 16 November to fight Davy Gallon at Probellum 1, losing the fight via KO.

Fighting style
Pearson is known for his powerful punches. His favourite grappling technique is the armbar.

Pearson has stated that his hero is Randy Couture.

Training
Pearson is a member of The Alliance MMA Gym. Nick Hands coaches Pearson's Muay Thai, Sean Casey coaches Pearson's boxing, and Barry Gibson serves as Pearson's strength and conditioning coach.

Personal life 
Pearson has an Australian wife, Kristie Jane Pearson. Kristie works as a ring girl for the UFC. The two met at UFC and got married. Ross Pearson moved to Australia to be with his wife. They had their first child, a girl, in 2016.

In his free time, Pearson does motocross.

Filmography

TV series

Video games

Championships and accomplishments

Mixed martial arts
Ultimate Fighting Championship
The Ultimate Fighter 9 Tournament Winner (Lightweight)
Fight of the Night (Three times) vs.    Dennis Siver, Edson Barboza and John Makdessi
Performance of the Night (One time) vs. Sam Stout
Ultimate Force
UF Lightweight Champion (One time)
One successful title defense
Total Combat
Lightweight Champion
Strike and Submit
Lightweight Champion

Mixed martial arts record

|Loss
|align=center|20–17 (1)
|Davy Gallon
|KO (rolling thunder kick)
|Probellum 1
|
|align=center|3
|align=center|4:26
|Brentwood, Essex, England
|
|-
|Loss
|align=center|20–16 (1)
|Desmond Green
|TKO (punches)
|UFC on ESPN: Barboza vs. Gaethje 
|
|align=center|1
|align=center|2:52
|Philadelphia, Pennsylvania, United States
|
|-
|Loss
|align=center|20–15 (1)
|John Makdessi
|Decision (unanimous)
|UFC on Fox: Alvarez vs. Poirier 2 
|
|align=center|3
|align=center|5:00
|Calgary, Alberta, Canada
|
|-
|Win
|align=center|20–14 (1)
|Mizuto Hirota
|Decision (unanimous)
|UFC 221 
|
|align=center|3
|align=center|5:00
|Perth, Australia
|
|-
|Loss
|align=center|19–14 (1)
|Dan Hooker
|KO (knee)
|UFC Fight Night: Lewis vs. Hunt
|
|align=center|2
|align=center|3:02
|Auckland, New Zealand
|
|-
|Loss
|align=center|19–13 (1)
|Stevie Ray
|Decision (split)
|UFC Fight Night: Mousasi vs. Hall 2
|
|align=center|3
|align=center|5:00
|Belfast, Northern Ireland
|  
|-
|Loss
|align=center|19–12 (1)
|Jorge Masvidal
|Decision (unanimous)
|UFC 201 
|
|align=center|3
|align=center|5:00
|Atlanta, Georgia, United States
|
|-
|Loss
|align=center|19–11 (1)
|Will Brooks
|Decision (unanimous)
|The Ultimate Fighter: Team Joanna vs. Team Cláudia Finale
|
|align=center|3
|align=center|5:00
|Las Vegas, Nevada, United States
|
|-
|Win
|align=center|19–10 (1)
|Chad Laprise
|Decision (split)
|UFC Fight Night: Hunt vs. Mir
|
|align=center|3
|align=center|5:00
|Brisbane, Australia
| 
|-
|Loss
|align=center|18–10 (1)
|Francisco Trinaldo
|Decision (unanimous)
|UFC Fight Night: Dillashaw vs. Cruz
|
|align=center|3
|align=center|5:00
|Boston, Massachusetts, United States
|
|-
|Win
|align=center|18–9 (1)
|Paul Felder
|Decision (split)
|UFC 191
|
|align=center|3
|align=center|5:00
|Las Vegas, Nevada, United States
|
|-
|Loss
|align=center|17–9 (1)
|Evan Dunham
|Decision (unanimous)
|UFC Fight Night: Bisping vs. Leites
|
|align=center|3
|align=center|5:00
|Glasgow, Scotland, Scotland
|
|-
|Win
|align=center|17–8 (1)
|Sam Stout
|KO (punches)
|UFC 185
|
|align=center|2
|align=center|1:33
|Dallas, Texas, United States
|
|-
|Loss
|align=center|16–8 (1)
| Al Iaquinta
| TKO (punches)
| UFC Fight Night: Rockhold vs. Bisping
| 
|align=center|2
|align=center|1:39
| Sydney, Australia
| 
|-
|Win
|align=center|16–7 (1)
|Gray Maynard
|TKO (punches)
|UFC Fight Night: Bader vs. St. Preux
| 
|align=center|2
|align=center|1:35
|Bangor, Maine, United States
|
|-
|Loss
|align=center|15–7 (1)
|Diego Sanchez
|Decision (split)
|UFC Fight Night: Henderson vs. Khabilov
|
|align=center|3
|align=center|5:00
|Albuquerque, New Mexico, United States
|
|-
|NC
|align=center|15–6 (1)
|Melvin Guillard
| NC (illegal knee)
| UFC Fight Night: Machida vs. Munoz
| 
| align=center| 1
| align=center| 1:57
| Manchester, England
|
|-
|Win
|align=center|15–6
|Ryan Couture
|TKO (punches)
|UFC on Fuel TV: Mousasi vs. Latifi
|
|align=center|2
|align=center|3:45
|Stockholm, Sweden
|
|-
|Win
|align=center|14–6
|George Sotiropoulos
|TKO (punches)
|UFC on FX: Sotiropoulos vs. Pearson
|
|align=center|3
|align=center|0:41
|Gold Coast, Australia
|
|-
|Loss
|align=center|13–6
|Cub Swanson
|TKO (punches)
| UFC on FX: Maynard vs. Guida
| 
|align=center|2
|align=center|4:14
|Atlantic City, New Jersey, United States
|
|-
|Win
|align=center|13–5
|Junior Assunção
|Decision (unanimous)
| UFC 141
| 
|align=center|3
|align=center|5:00
|Las Vegas, Nevada, United States
|
|-
|Loss
|align=center|12–5
|Edson Barboza
|Decision (split)
| UFC 134
| 
|align=center|3
|align=center|5:00
|Rio de Janeiro, Brazil
| 
|-
|Win
|align=center|12–4
|Spencer Fisher
| Decision (unanimous)
|UFC 127
|
|align=center| 3
|align=center| 5:00
|Sydney, Australia
|
|-
|Loss
|align=center|11–4
|Cole Miller
|Submission (rear-naked choke)
|UFC Fight Night: Marquardt vs. Palhares
|
|align=center|2
|align=center|1:49
|Austin, Texas, United States
|
|-
|Win
|align=center|11–3
|Dennis Siver
|Decision (unanimous)
|UFC Fight Night: Florian vs. Gomi
|
|align=center|3
|align=center|5:00
|Charlotte, North Carolina, United States
|
|-
|Win
|align=center|10–3
|Aaron Riley
|TKO (doctor stoppage)
|UFC 105
|
|align=center|2
|align=center|4:38
|Manchester, England
|
|-
|Win
|align=center|9–3
|Andre Winner
|Decision (unanimous)
|The Ultimate Fighter: United States vs. United Kingdom Finale
|
|align=center|3
|align=center|5:00
|Las Vegas, Nevada, United States
|
|-
|Win
|align=center|8–3
|Ian Jones
|Submission (rear-naked choke)
|Ultimate Force: Nemesis
|
|align=center|1
|align=center|3:33
|Doncaster, England
|
|-
|Loss
|align=center|7–3
|Abdul Mohamed 
|Decision (unanimous)
|Cage Gladiators 9: Beatdown
|
|align=center|3
|align=center|5:00
|Liverpool, England
|
|-
|Win
|align=center|7–2
|Cedric Celerier
|TKO (submission to punches)
|MMA Total Combat 24
|
|align=center|1
|align=center|2:35
|London, England
|
|-
|Win
|align=center|6–2
|Aidan Marron
|Submission (armbar)
|Ultimate Force: Punishment
|
|align=center|3
|align=center|4:34
|Doncaster, England
|
|-
|Win
|align=center|5–2
|Sami Berik
|Submission (triangle choke)
|Strike and Submit 6 
|
|align=center|1
|align=center|0:37
|Gateshead, England
|
|-
|Win
|align=center|4–2
|Mark Spencer
|TKO (punches)
|MMA Total Combat 23
|
|align=center|1
|align=center|3:44
|Cornwall, England
|
|-
|Win
|align=center|3–2
|Steve Tetley
|Submission (armbar) 
|CWFC: Enter The Rough House 5
|
|align=center|1
|align=center|4:46
|Nottingham, England
|
|-
|Win
|align=center|2–2
|Gavin Bradley
|KO (punch)
|MMA Total Combat 22
|
|align=center|1
|align=center|2:05
|Cornwall, England
|
|-
|Loss
|align=center|1–2
|Curt Warburton
|TKO (doctor stoppage)
|MMA Total Combat 21
|
|align=center|1
|align=center|5:00
|Cornwall, England
|
|-
|Win
|align=center|1–1
|Will Burke
|Decision
|MMA Total Combat 21
|
|align=center|3
|align=center|5:00
|Cornwall, England
|
|-
|Loss
|align=center|0–1
|Chris Hughes
|Submission (rear-naked choke)
|HOP 1: Fight Night 1
|
|align=center|2
|align=center|2:33
|Swansea, Wales
|

Mixed martial arts exhibition record

| Win
| align=center| 3–0
| Jason Dent
| Decision (unanimous)
| The Ultimate Fighter: United States vs. United Kingdom
|  (airdate)
| align=center| 3
| align=center| 5:00
| Las Vegas, Nevada, United States
| 
|-
| Win
| align=center| 2–0
| Richie Whitson
| Submission (armbar)
| The Ultimate Fighter: United States vs. United Kingdom
|  (airdate)
| align=center| 1
| align=center| 3:40
| Las Vegas, Nevada, United States
| 
|-
| Win
| align=center| 1–0
| A.J. Wenn
| TKO (punches)
| The Ultimate Fighter: United States vs. United Kingdom
|  (airdate)
| align=center| 2
| align=center| 0:21
| Las Vegas, Nevada, United States
|

Professional boxing record

See also

 List of current UFC fighters
 List of male mixed martial artists

References

External links

Official UFC Profile

 

The Ultimate Fighter winners
Living people
English male mixed martial artists
English expatriate sportspeople in Australia
Featherweight mixed martial artists
Lightweight mixed martial artists
1984 births
English male judoka
English male taekwondo practitioners
English practitioners of Brazilian jiu-jitsu
Mixed martial artists utilizing taekwondo
Mixed martial artists utilizing boxing
Mixed martial artists utilizing judo
Mixed martial artists utilizing Brazilian jiu-jitsu
Sportspeople from Sunderland
Alumni of the University of Sunderland
Ultimate Fighting Championship male fighters